Roy Markham Lewis (29 June 1948 – 5 May 2022) was an English cricketer. A right-handed opening batsman, he played 38 first-class and 14 List A matches for Surrey between 1968 and 1973.

Lewis's highest first-class score was 87 against Kent in 1969. He often played for Surrey's first team when other players were playing for England. He was a stalwart for Spencer Cricket Club in Surrey from 1968 to 1990. He was the first player in the Surrey Championship to score 10,000 runs.

References

External links
 

1948 births
2022 deaths
English cricketers
Surrey cricketers
People from Bromley
Sportspeople from Kent